D. dianthi may refer to:

 Davidiella dianthi, a plant pathogen
 Dinemasporium dianthi, a plant pathogen
 Diplodia dianthi, an anamorphic fungus